Pablo Sebastian Portela (born 21 June 1980) is an Argentine handball player for UNLu and the Argentina men's national handball team.

He defended Argentina at the 2012 London Summer Olympics, and at the 2015 World Men's Handball Championship in Qatar.

References

External links

1980 births
Living people
Argentine male handball players
Olympic handball players of Argentina
Handball players at the 2012 Summer Olympics
Handball players at the 2016 Summer Olympics
Sportspeople from Buenos Aires
Handball players at the 2015 Pan American Games
Handball players at the 2011 Pan American Games
Pan American Games medalists in handball
Pan American Games gold medalists for Argentina
Pan American Games silver medalists for Argentina
Medalists at the 2015 Pan American Games
Medalists at the 2011 Pan American Games
21st-century Argentine people